Finucane is an Irish surname (Anglicized form of the Gaelic Ó Fionnmhacáin, meaning "descendant of Fionnmhacán". Fionnmhacán is a name meaning "fionn ‘fair, white’ + the diminutive of mac ‘son’") and may refer to:

People
Al Finucane (born 1943), Irish football player
Anne Finucane, American banker
Brendan Finucane (1920–1942), also known as Paddy Finucane, Second World War Royal Air Force (RAF) fighter pilot
Charles C. Finucane (1905–1983), American government official, banking and investments executive
Dale Finucane (born 1991), Australian rugby league footballer
Eddie Finucane (1916–1991), Australian rugby league footballer
Hilary Finucane, American computational biologist
John Finucane (born 1980), Irish politician and UK Member of Parliament (Sinn Féin) for Belfast North
John Finucane (Limerick politician) (1843–1902), Irish politician, MP for County Limerick East 1885–1900
Marian Finucane (1950–2020), Irish broadcaster
Matthias Finucane (1737–1814), Irish judge
Michael Finucane (born 1943), Irish Fine Gael politician
Mick Finucane (1922–2016), Irish Gaelic football player
Moira Finucane, Australian actor and performer
Paddy Finucane (1920–1942), Second World War UK Royal Air Force (RAF) fighter pilot and flying ace
Pat Finucane (1949–1989), Irish human rights lawyer killed by loyalist paramilitaries
Patrick Finucane (Irish politician) (1890–1984), Irish Clann na Talmhan TD for Kerry North
William S. Finucane (1888–1951), American politician and business

Others
Finucane Island, an island in the Pilbara region of Western Australia
Pat Finucane Centre (PFC), a human rights advocacy and lobbying entity in Northern Ireland